The Building at 1505–1509 Oak Avenue is a historic apartment building in Evanston, Illinois. The three-story brick building was built in 1925. The building is L-shaped with a half courtyard, a relatively common apartment layout in Evanston. Architect Samuel N. Crowen, who designed two other apartment buildings in Evanston, designed the building. The building's design features limestone pilasters separating its windows, limestone quoins, pilasters and a pediment around the entrance, and a brick parapet.

The building was added to the National Register of Historic Places on March 15, 1984.

References

Buildings and structures on the National Register of Historic Places in Cook County, Illinois
Residential buildings on the National Register of Historic Places in Illinois
Buildings and structures in Evanston, Illinois
Apartment buildings in Illinois
Residential buildings completed in 1925